Beirut is the capital city of Lebanon.

Beirut, Beyrut or Bayrut may also refer to:

Places
 Greater Beirut, an urban agglomeration comprising the city of Beirut and the adjacent municipalities
 Beirut Governorate, a Lebanese governorate
 Beirut Vilayet,  a first-level administrative division (vilayet) of the Ottoman Empire
 Berytus, the ancient city of Beirut
 Beirut River, a river in Lebanon
 Beyrut, Iran, a village in Iran

Arts and entertainment
 Beirut (band), an indie band which originated in New Mexico
Beirut, a 1997 compilation album by Fairuz
 Beirut, a 2018 studio album by Massari
 Beirut (art space), an art space in Egypt
 Beirut (film), a 2018 American political thriller film directed by Brad Anderson
 "Beirut", a song by Peter Sarstedt

Other uses
 Beirut (drinking game), a drinking game
 Beirut, official name of extra solar planet HD 192263 b

See also
 Bayreuth, a town in Germany
 West Beirut (film), a 1998 Lebanese drama film directed by Ziad Doueiri
 Bierut, a surname (including a list of people with the name)
 Beirute sandwich
 Beyrouth Après Rasage, a film by Hani Tamba
 Beyrout meteorite of 1921, which fell in Beirut, Lebanon; See Meteorite falls
 Biruta (disambiguation)